Robert Wade Hammock (born May 13, 1977) is an American professional baseball former catcher and current coach. He was formerly a longtime player and later quality control and catching coach for the Arizona Diamondbacks.

Playing career
Hammock was drafted three times: in 1995 by the Florida Marlins, in 1997 by the Tampa Bay Devil Rays, and in 1998 by the Arizona Diamondbacks. In 2003, he played in 65 games for the major league club, batting .282 and starting 28 games at catcher. His numbers were good enough to earn him a place on the 2003 Topps All-Star Rookie Roster. Robby was the third catcher behind Chad Moeller and Rod Barajas for Arizona in 2003.

Along with Matt Kata, Alex Cintrón, Brandon Webb, and others, he was one of the "Baby Backs" who were called up when a surge of injuries hit Diamondbacks veteran players in 2003. The Baby Backs were popular and contributed to a winning season, but ultimately failed to make the playoffs.1

In , Hammock made two brief minor league stops before rejoining the Diamondbacks. He played in 62 games, starting 46 at catcher and hit .241 with 16 doubles that season. On May 18, 2004, he caught Randy Johnson's perfect game.

He was on the roster for the  Sidewinders, in which he played multiple positions. He was called up after the Sidewinders won the Pacific Coast League Championship game, and appeared in only one game.

Hammock was non-tendered following the  season, and became a free agent. On January 12, he signed a minor league contract with an invitation to spring training with the Baltimore Orioles.

On February 1, 2010, Hammock signed a minor league contract with the Colorado Rockies.  On April 3, 2010, Hammock was traded to the New York Yankees for a player to be named later. Hammock signed a minor league contract with the Diamondbacks for the 2011 season.

Coaching career
Hammock began his coaching career in the D-Backs' minor-league system, managing in 2014 for the Visalia Rawhide and 2015 and 2016 for the Mobile BayBears.

In November 2016 Hammock was named as quality control/catching coach for the Arizona Diamondbacks.

In October 2018, Hammock was named the manager of the Tigres del Licey of the Dominican Winter League.

As of 2022, Hammock is the hitting coach for the El Paso Chihuahuas, Triple-A affiliate for the San Diego Padres.

References

External links

1977 births
Living people
Arizona Diamondbacks coaches
Arizona Diamondbacks players
Baseball players from Georgia (U.S. state)
El Paso Diablos players
Georgia Bulldogs baseball players
Georgia Perimeter Jaguars baseball players
Gulf Coast Yankees players
High Desert Mavericks players
Lancaster JetHawks players
Lethbridge Black Diamonds players
Major League Baseball catchers
Norfolk Tides players
Reno Aces players
Scranton/Wilkes-Barre Yankees players
South Bend Silver Hawks players
Tucson Sidewinders players
Águilas Cibaeñas players
American expatriate baseball players in the Dominican Republic